Mírzá Valíyu'lláh Khán-i-Varqá (‎ ; 18841955) was a prominent Persian Baháʼí who was appointed a Hand of the Cause by Shoghi Effendi. 

He was the son of Varqá, the martyr-poet, and the father of ʻAlí-Muhammad Varqá, (1911 – September 22, 2007).

Varqá joined ʻAbdu'l-Bahá's entourage while he traveled across America. He was appointed Trustee of the Huqúqu'lláh in 1940 and a Hand of the Cause in 1951.

References 

Baháʼí World, Vol. 13, pp. 831–4.

External links 
 Valíyu'lláh Varqá at Find-a-Grave.com

Valiyu'llah
Valiyu'llah
1955 deaths
1884 births
19th-century Bahá'ís
20th-century Bahá'ís